Oakhurst, also known as Winston Place and Mitchell Place, is a historic house in Emelle, Sumter County, Alabama.  The two-story wood-frame house was built for Augustus Anthony Winston, a banker and cotton factor from Mobile, in 1854.   The Greek Revival-style structure is five bays wide, with a one-story porch spanning the entire width of the primary facade.  A bracketed cornice atop the entablature wraps around the entire house.  It reflects the influence of the Italianate-style.  This architectural combination, sometimes referred to as a "bracketed Greek Revival" style, was popular in Alabama from the 1850s to 1890s.

The house was added to the Alabama Register of Landmarks and Heritage on January 14, 1980, and to the National Register of Historic Places on January 6, 1987.

References

National Register of Historic Places in Sumter County, Alabama
Properties on the Alabama Register of Landmarks and Heritage
Houses on the National Register of Historic Places in Alabama
Greek Revival houses in Alabama
Italianate architecture in Alabama
Houses in Sumter County, Alabama
Houses completed in 1854